Petrus (Peter) van de Merwe (13 January 1942 – 24 February 2016) was a Dutch footballer who played as a goalkeeper.

Club career
Nicknamed the Black Panther of Breda, Van de Merwe played his entire career for hometown club NAC.

Van de Merwe played his final league game against AZ'67 in October 1970 and retired at 29 after persisting injury worries and totaling 257 matches for NAC. He was later diagnosed with rheumatics and spent time in a wheelchair.

International career
He made his debut for the Netherlands in a May 1962 friendly match against Northern Ireland and has earned a total of 5 caps, scoring no goals. His final international was a November 1962 European Championship qualification match against Switzerland.

Personal life and death
After retiring as a player, Van de Merwe moved to Sint Willebrord where he worked as a janitor at a school and a sports centre. He died of cancer in Sint Willebrord in February 2016.

References

External links
 
 

1942 births
2016 deaths
Footballers from Breda
Association football goalkeepers
Dutch footballers
Netherlands international footballers
NAC Breda players
Deaths from cancer in the Netherlands
Janitors